Miguel Ángel Peña (born 8 July 1970) is a Spanish racing cyclist. He rode in three editions of the Tour de France, two editions of the Vuelta a España, and three editions of the Giro d'Italia.

Major results
1995
2nd GP Miguel Induráin
1998
2nd Overall Critérium du Dauphiné libéré
1st Stage 7
2000
1st Overall Vuelta a Andalucía
1st Stage 3

References

External links
 

1970 births
Living people
Spanish male cyclists
Sportspeople from Granada
Cyclists from Andalusia